Jacques Polge (born 14 June 1943) is a French perfumer, best known for his role as Head Perfumer at Les Parfums Chanel from 1978 to 2015.

Early life 
Jacques Polge grew up near Avignon, France, where he says he was inspired as a child by the scent of air in the surroundings of Grasse, which was redolent with the scent of jasmine. After university, Jacques Polge began a traditional apprenticeship in Grasse under the guidance of Jean Carles.

Works 

 1970 - Rive Gauche, Yves Saint Laurent
 1982 - Diva, Emanuel Ungaro
 1987 - Senso, Emanuel Ungaro
 1990 - Ungaro, Emanuel Ungaro
 1989 - Tiffany for Men, Tiffany

Polge's perfumes at Chanel include:
 1982 - Antaeus
 1984 - Coco
inspired by the Parisian home of Coco Chanel
 1990 - Égoïste
originally launched as a limited edition scent named "Bois Noir"' in 1987, the fragrance was eventually relaunched to the general market under the name Égoïste. Jacques Polge has said Égoïste is his favourite creation.
 1996 - Allure 
 1999 - Allure Homme 
including flankers Allure Homme Sport, Allure Homme Sport Cologne, Allure Homme Sport Extreme, Allure Homme Edition Blanche.
 2001 - Coco Mademoiselle 
winner of FiFi Award for Best National Advertising Campaign / TV in 2008
 2002 - Chance
 2010 - Bleu de Chanel 
 Les Exclusifs de Chanel fragrances notably Coromandel and Sycomore created with Christopher Sheldrake.
 2012 - Coco Noir 
created with Christopher Sheldrake

References 

Living people
French perfumers
Chanel people
1943 births